Ovaj zid stoji krivo (On One Side is this Wall Bended) is the second studio album by the Serbian indie/alternative rock band Obojeni Program released by the Serbian independent record label Tom Tom Music in 1991. The album was released in LP and cassette format only and was rereleased on CD only as a part of the compilation album Obojeni program consisting of the material from the first two studio albums.

Track listing 
All music and lyrics by Obojeni Program.

Personnel 
The band
 Bedov Miroslav — bass guitar
 Edi Keler — drums
 Zoran Lekić "Leki" — guitar
 Branislav Babić "Kebra" — vocals

Additional personnel
 Momir Grujić "Fleka" — design [logo]
 Toba — photography
 Dušan Kojić "Koja" — production
 Vlada Žeželj — recorded by

References 
 Ovaj zid stoji krivo at Discogs
 EX YU ROCK enciklopedija 1960-2006, Janjatović Petar; 
 NS rockopedija, novosadska rock scena 1963-2003, Mijatović Bogomir, SWITCH, 2005

Obojeni Program albums
1991 albums